Instead may refer to:

 Instead (album), a 2007 album by Onetwo
 "Instead", a 2003 song by Stacie Orrico off her self-titled album
 "Instead" (Madeleine Peyroux song), a 2009 song
INSTEAD, is an interpreter program for text-based adventure games.